The three-dimensional torus, or 3-torus, is defined as any topological space that is homeomorphic to the Cartesian product of three circles,  In contrast, the usual torus is the Cartesian product of only two circles.

The 3-torus is a three-dimensional compact manifold with no boundary. It can be obtained by "gluing" the three pairs of opposite faces of a cube, where being "glued" can be intuitively understood to mean that when a particle moving in the interior of the cube reaches a point on a face, it goes through it and appears to come forth from the corresponding point on the opposite face, producing periodic boundary conditions. Gluing only one pair of opposite faces produces a solid torus while gluing two of these pairs produces the solid space between two nested tori.

In 1984, Alexei Starobinsky and Yakov Borisovich Zel'dovich at the Landau Institute in Moscow proposed a cosmological model where the shape of the universe is a 3-torus.

References

Sources
 .
 .

3-manifolds
Differential topology
Differential geometry
Geometric topology
Topology